The Sechura Desert is a coastal desert located south of the Piura Region of Peru along the Pacific Ocean coast and inland to the foothills of the Andes Mountains. Its extreme aridity is caused by the upwelling of cold coastal waters and subtropical atmospheric subsidence, but it is also subject to occasional flooding during El Niño years. In 1728, the town of Sechura was destroyed by a tsunami and was later rebuilt in its present location. Short rivers flowing across the desert from the Andes support intensive irrigation-based agriculture.

Location and extent

At its northern end near the city of Piura, the Sechura Desert transitions to the Tumbes–Piura dry forests ecoregion. Including much of eastern Lambayeque Region, this habitat is composed of equatorial dry forests.

History
While a desert, the Sechura has been subject to flooding from rivers and to storms driven in from the Pacific Ocean.  In 1728, a tsunami generated from an earthquake swept inland, destroying the town of Sechura, then located closer to the water.  Survivors moved inland and re-established the town in its current location.

During El Niño years, flooding in the desert regularly occurs. In 1998, the runoff from the flooding rivers poured into the coastal Sechura Desert.

Climate
The Peruvian Desert has a low range of temperature changes due to the moderating effect of the nearby Pacific Ocean.  Because of the upwelling of cold coastal waters and subtropical atmospheric subsidence, the desert is one of the most arid on Earth.

Geography

The Bayóvar Depression, which is the lowest point in Peru and all of the Southern Tropics, is located in this desert.

The numerous short rivers that cross the Sechura supported prehistoric indigenous human settlements for millennia. A number of urban cultures flourished here, including the Moche. The Moche survived on a diet of fish, guinea pigs, camelids, squash, and peanuts. The Sican Culture (circa 800–1300 CE) succeeded the Moche, and developed refined techniques of lost wax goldsmithing. 

Today, the rivers support intensive irrigated agriculture on the fertile bottomlands. Two of Peru's five largest cities, including Piura and Chiclayo, lie within the agricultural region in the north.

See also

List of deserts
Nazca Lines
Atacama Desert
Chala

References

External links
Atacama–Sechura Deserts at WWF website
 documentary about Illescas peninsula, in the heart of the Sechura desert

Deserts and xeric shrublands
Deserts of Chile
Deserts of Peru
Geography of Piura Region
Neotropical ecoregions
ecoregions of Peru